Yakub Kolas (also Jakub Kołas,  – August 13, 1956), real name Kanstantsin Mikhailovich Mitskievich (Канстанці́н Міха́йлавіч Міцке́віч) was a Belarusian writer, dramatist, poet and translator. People's Poet of the Byelorussian SSR (1926), member (1928) and vice-president (from 1929) of the Belarusian Academy of Sciences.

In his works, Yakub Kolas was known for his sympathy towards the ordinary Belarusian peasantry. This was evident in his pen name 'Kolas', meaning 'ear of grain' in Belarusian. He wrote collections of poems Songs of Captivity (1908) and Songs of Grief (1910), poems A New Land (1923) and Simon the Musician (1925), stories, and plays. His poem The Fisherman's Hut (1947) is about the fight after unification of Belarus with the Soviet state. His trilogy At a Crossroads (1925) is about the pre-Revolutionary life of the Belarusian peasantry and the democratic intelligentsia. He was awarded the Stalin Prize in 1946 and 1949.

In his honor, the Yakub Kolas Square and the Yakub Kolas Street in the center of Minsk bear his name.

Bibliography

Biographies
Вялікі пясняр беларускага народа. Зборнік артыкулаў аб жыцці і дзейнасці Якуба Коласа. Мінск, 1959.
З жыццяпісу Якуба Коласа: Дакументы і матэрыялы / Уклад., уступ. артыкул і імян. паказ. Г. В. Кісялёва; Рэд. В. В. Барысенка, М. І. Мушынскі. Мінск, 1982.
Казбярук У. М. Колас Якуб // Беларуская энцыклапедыя. У 18 т. Т. 8. Мінск, 1999. С. 382—384.
Лужанін М. Колас расказвае пра сябе. Мінск, 1982.
Мацюх М. Д., Мушынскі М. І. Колас Якуб // Беларускія пісьменнікі: Біябібліягр. слоўн. У 6 т. Т. 3 / Ін-т літ. імя Я. Купалы АН Рэспублікі Беларусь, Беларус. Энцыкл.; Пад рэд. А. В. Мальдзіса. Мінск, 1994. С. 299—304.
Мушынскі М. І. Коласазнаўства // Беларуская энцыклапедыя. У 18 т. Т. 8. Мінск:, 1999. С. 386—387.
Мушынскі М. І. Якуб Колас: Летапіс жыцця і творчасці. Мінск, 1982.
Мушынскі М. І. Летапіс жыцця і творчасці Якуба Коласа. — Мінск: Беларуская навука, 2012. — 1127 с. — .
Навуменка І. Я. Якуб Колас: Нарыс жыцця і творчасці. Мінск, 1982.
Разам з народам. Матэрыялы юбілейнай навуковай сесіі АН БССР, прысвечанай 100-годдзю з дня нараджэння Янкі Купалы і Якуба Коласа / Пад рэд. І. Я. Навуменкі. Мінск, 1983.
Тычына М. Колас Якуб // Энцыклапедыя гісторыі Беларусі. У 6 т. Т. 4. Мінск, 1997. С. 225—227.
Якуб Колас: Да 100-годдзя з дня нараджэння. Біябібліягр. паказ. / Склад. Н. Б. Ватацы, М. І. Пратасевіч, Н. А. Адамовіч, А. Б. Дунаеўская; Рэд. В. П. Рагойша. Мінск, 1983.
Янка Купала і Якуб Колас у кантэксце славянскіх літаратур. — Мн., 2002.

References

External links

1882 births
1956 deaths
20th-century Belarusian poets
20th-century Belarusian writers
20th-century pseudonymous writers
20th-century translators
People from Stowbtsy
People from Minsk Region
Academicians of the Byelorussian SSR Academy of Sciences
Communist Party of the Soviet Union members
Second convocation members of the Supreme Soviet of the Soviet Union
Third convocation members of the Supreme Soviet of the Soviet Union
Fourth convocation members of the Supreme Soviet of the Soviet Union
Members of the Central Committee of the Communist Party of Byelorussia
Members of the Central Executive Committee of the Byelorussian Soviet Socialist Republic
Members of the Supreme Soviet of the Byelorussian SSR (1938–1946)
Members of the Supreme Soviet of the Byelorussian SSR (1947–1950)
Members of the Supreme Soviet of the Byelorussian SSR (1951–1954)
Members of the Supreme Soviet of the Byelorussian SSR (1955–1959)
Stalin Prize winners
Recipients of the Order of Lenin
Recipients of the Order of the Red Banner
Recipients of the Order of the Red Banner of Labour
Belarusian-language writers
Socialist realism writers
Translators of Alexander Pushkin
Belarusian dramatists and playwrights
Belarusian male poets
Belarusian male writers
Belarusian translators
Soviet children's writers
Soviet dramatists and playwrights
Soviet male poets
Soviet male writers
Soviet translators